The University of Uyo is located in Uyo, capital of Akwa Ibom State, Nigeria. The university was formerly known as the University of Cross River State, Uyo. 

On 1 October 1991 the Federal government of Nigeria established it as a Federal University and the name was changed to the University of Uyo. The university inherited students, staff, academic programmes and the entire facilities of the erstwhile University of Cross River State established by Cross River State in 1983. It must be placed on record that what is today University of Uyo passed through several metamorphoses. It grew from a Teacher's College (TC) to Advanced Teacher's College (ATC), College of Education (COE), which became an affiliate of University of Port Harcourt to run degree programmes to a State University, University of Cross River (UNICROSS), and then to its present status in 1991.

Academic activities commenced during the 1991/92 academic session. The University of Uyo has 13 faculties, the postgraduate school and the school of continuing Education.

Professor Enefiok Essien, is the immediate past Vice-Chancellor. In 2015 the Emir of Hadejia, Adamu Maje was appointed Chancellor.

General information
The university is in the heart of Uyo, capital of Akwa Ibom State, Nigeria's second largest oil-producing state. Uyo is easily accessible by road, although there is an international airport for external use(s). It operates from four campuses:
 The Permanent Site/Main Campus which accommodates Parts of Central Administration, Faculties of Engineering and Natural and Applied Sciences, Faculty of Agriculture, International Centre for Energy and Environmental Sustainability Research (ICEESR), and the Postgraduate School
 The Town Campus which accommodates Faculties of Arts, Education, Social Sciences, Pharmacy
 The Annex Campus, home for the Business Administration, Law, Environmental Studies and General Studies 
 The Ime Umana Campus, Ediene Abak, which accommodates the Pre-Degree, JUPEB and other special courses.

The permanent site which houses the main campus of the university along Nwaniba Road is about 4.5 km from the city centre and covers an area of about 1,443 hectares.
The university of Uyo has 12 faculties, the School of Continuing Education and the Post Graduate School. The faculties are as follows:

 Faculty of Agriculture
 Faculty of Arts
 Faculty of Basic Medical Sciences
 Faculty of Business Administration
 Faculty of Clinical Sciences
 Faculty of education
 Faculty of Engineering
 Faculty of Environmental studies
 Faculty of Law
 Faculty of Science
 Faculty of Social Sciences 
 Faculty of Pharmacy
 Faculty of Communication and Media Studies
 Faculty of Vocational Education

Faculties

Facilities

Library
The Library has an active collection of 46,745 volumes and handles about 409,977 lending and reference inquiries annually. Current journals stand at 271 representing all disciplinary interests. The library is equipped with modern computers and has a reading space of 970.51 metres with seating capacity for 698.

There are four main divisions: Acquisition, Lending, Processing, and Research. The Research Division comprises Reference, Serials, Special Collections and Government Collections. The Special Collection comprises Nyong Essien, Africana and Government Collection. Acquisition and Processing selects and orders library materials and organizes them for effective use. The Public Service Division deals directly with readers, regulates the use of library materials, and handles reference questions. The office of university librarian provides data for planning, budgeting, control and coordination of the library.

Radio station
UNIUYO owns and operates radio station UNIUYO FM (100.7 MHz) in Uyo.

Affiliate institutions
Below are a list of affiliate institutions of the University of Uyo, approved by the National Universities Commission (NUC).

 Akwa Ibom State College of Education
 St. Joseph Major Seminary, Ikot Ekpene
 Assemblies of God Divinity School, Old Umuahia
 The Apostolic Church Theological Seminary, Amumara
 The Samuel Bill Theological College, Abak
 Topfaith University, Mkpatak
 Osun State College of Education, Ila-Orangun (Regular)

Vice chancellors
 Professor Fola Lasisi
 Professor Akpan Hogan Ekpo
 Professor Akaneren Essien
 Professor Comfort Memfin Ekpo
 Professor Enefiok Essien
 Professor Nyaudoh Ndaeyo

Notable alumni

 Bassey Albert, politician
 Valerie Ebe, lawyer and politician
 Ini Edo, actress 
 Michael Enyong, politician
 Onofiok Luke, politician
 El Mafrex, urban gospel singer-songwriter
 Aniebiet Inyang Ntui, EU Ambassador, University Librarian of University of Calabar and Professor of Library and Information Science
 Emeka Onowu, politician
 John James Akpan Udo-Edehe, politician
 Ime Bishop Umoh, actor

Notable faculty
Akpan Hogan Ekpo (Professor of Economics, former vice chancellor of the university from 2000 to 2005)
Joshua Uzoigwe (Music)

References

External links
 University of Uyo Website
 University of Uyo Portal

 
Uyo
Schools in Akwa Ibom State
Educational institutions established in 1991
1991 establishments in Nigeria